Mātā Sundarī  (died 1747) was the daughter of Ram Sarana, a Punjabi Soni Kumarāv Khatri of Bijwara Soni - in present-day Hoshiārpur district. She was the wife of Guru Gobind Singh. After the martyrdom of her child, Ajit Singh, she adopted a son named Ajit Singh Palit who was later killed on a false accusation that he had killed a Muslim dervish.

She holds a special place in Sikhism for the role she played in leading Sikhs after the ascension of Guru Gobind Singh.  A memorial in her honour stands in the compound of Gurdwara Bala Sahib, New Delhi.

Gallery

References

Punjabi people
Indian Sikhs
Family members of the Sikh gurus
1747 deaths